The 2010 Paris Motor Show took place from 2 October to 17 October 2010, in Paris expo Porte de Versailles.

For 2010, the theme of the special exhibition was "The Incredible Collection 2: automobile manufacturers collections and museums."

Introductions

Production cars

 Audi A7
 Audi R8 Spyder
 Bentley Continental GT
 BMW X3
 Chevrolet Aveo
 Chevrolet Captiva
 Chevrolet Cruze Hatchback
 Chevrolet Orlando
 Citroën C4 II
 Citroën C5 facelift
 Citroën DS4
 Ferrari 599 GTO
 Ferrari 599 SA Aperta
 Ford Focus ST
 Ford Mondeo ECOnetic
 Honda Jazz Hybrid
 Hyundai Genesis Coupe (European debut)
 Hyundai i10
 Hyundai ix20
 Jeep Grand Cherokee (European debut)
 Lexus IS
 Lotus Evora S
 Lotus Evora IPS
 Maserati GranTurismo MC Stradale
 Mastretta MXT
 Mazda 2 restyle
 Mercedes-Benz A-Class#W169 electric
 Mercedes-Benz CLS-Class (W218)
 Nissan GT-R facelift
 Nissan X-Trail facelift
 Opel Astra Sports Tourer
 Peugeot 3008 Hybrid4
 Peugeot 508 (World debut)
 Porsche 911 Carrera GTS
 Porsche 911 Speedster
 Range Rover Evoque
 Renault Espace facelift
 Renault Laguna facelift
 Renault Latitude
 Renault Twizy
 Saab 9-3 SportWagon Electric
 Suzuki Swift
 Toyota Ractis
 Toyota Verso-S (World debut)
 Venturi Fétish II
 Volkswagen Passat facelift, (B7)
 Volvo S60 R-Design
 Volvo V60

Concept cars

 Audi e-Tron Spyder
 Audi quattro concept
 BMW 6 Series concept
 Citroën Lacoste
 Exagon Furtive e-GT
 Hyundai ix35 diesel-hybrid concept
 Infiniti IPL G Convertible concept
 Jaguar C-X75
 Kia Pop EV
 Lamborghini Sesto Elemento
 Lotus CityCar plug-in hybrid concept
 Lotus Elise concept
 Lotus Elite
 Lotus Esprit
 Lotus Eterne
 Mazda Shinari
 Nissan Townpod
 Opel GTC Paris
 Peugeot HR1
 Peugeot EX1 Concept
 Renault Zoe
 Renault DeZir
 Saab ePower
 SEAT IBE (updated)
 Toyota FT-CH (European debut)
 Venturi America
 Volvo C30 DRIVe Electric

Motorsport cars

 Citroën C4 WRC (Refresh)
 Citroën DS3 WRC (European Debut)  
 Ford Fiesta RS WRC (European Debut)
 Mini Countryman WRC (European Debut)

Exhibitors

 Abarth
 Alfa Romeo
 Aixam Mega
 Audi
 Bentley
 Bi-Scot
 BMW
 Cadillac
 Chatenet Automobiles
 Chevrolet
 Chrysler
 Citroën
 Comarth
 Courb
 CT&T United
 Dacia
 Eco & Mobilité
 Ecomobilys
 Eon Motors
 Exagon
 Ferrari
 Fiat
 Fisker
 Ford
 GEF Motors
 Grecav
 Heuliez
 Honda
 Hyundai
 Infiniti
 Isuzu
 Jaguar
 Jeep
 Kia
 Lamborghini
 Lancia
 Land Rover
 Lexus
 Ligier
 Lumeneo
 Mam Strager
 Maserati
 Mastretta
 Matra
 Maybach
 Mazda
 Mega
 Mercedes-Benz
 Microcar
 Mini
 Mitsubishi
 Nissan
 Think
 Opel
 Peugeot
 Porsche
 Renault
 Rolls-Royce
 Saab
 Seat
 Škoda Auto
 Smart
 Suzuki
 Tazzari
 Tesla Motors
 Toyota
 Pininfarina Bollore
 Venturi
 Volkswagen
 Volvo

See also

 Paris Motor Show

References

External links
Official web site
A-Z Paris motor show

Auto shows in France
Paris Motor Show
Paris Motor Show
Paris Motor Show